The largest lake on German territory is Lake Constance, while Lake Müritz is the largest lake located entirely within German territory.

List
(incomplete)
 Aartalsee 
 Binnenalster (Inner Alster Lake) 
 Brahmsee
 Breitlingsee
 Brombachsee
 Bullensee
 Chiemsee
 Lake Constance (Bodensee)
 Dümmersee
 Edersee
 Eibsee
 Ellbogensee
 Eschbach Reservoir
 Fleesensee
 Gelterswoogsee
 Gothensee
 Gottleuba Reservoir
 Großer Labussee
 Großer Müllroser See
 Großer Priepertsee
 Grunewaldsee
 Halbendorfer See
 Halterner See
 Hengsteysee
 Hohnsensee
 Kellersee
 Königssee (Bavaria)
 Krumme Lanke
 Kuhgrabensee
 Mahndorfer See
 Maschsee
 Mechower See
 Möhne Reservoir (Möhnesee)
 Möserscher See
 Müggelsee
 Müritz
 Norderteich
 Oder Reservoir
 Oker Reservoir
 Orankesee
 Parsteiner See
 Pfaffenteich
 Plauer See (Brandenburg)
 Plauer See (Mecklenburg-Vorpommern)
 Plöner See
 Plötzensee
 Quenzsee
 Röblinsee
 Scharmützelsee
 Schermützelsee
 Schluchsee
 Schweriner See
 Schmollensee
 Schwedtsee
 Seilersee
 Senftenberger See
 Sorpe Reservoir
 Söse Reservoir
 Stolpsee
 Lake Starnberg (Starnberger See)
 Steinhuder Meer
 Lake Tegel (Tegeler See)
 Useriner See
 Viereggenhöfer Teich
 Wangnitzsee
 Wannsee
 Wendsee
 Woblitzsee
 Wolgastsee
 Ziernsee
 Zwischenahner Meer

See also 

 List of dams and reservoirs in Germany
 List of lakes in Bavaria
 List of lakes of Hesse
 List of lakes in Mecklenburg-Vorpommern
 List of lakes of Rhineland-Palatinate
 List of lakes in Schleswig-Holstein